Minnehaha is a steam-powered excursion vessel on Lake Minnetonka in the U.S. state of Minnesota. The vessel was originally in service between 1906 and 1926. After being scuttled in 1926, Minnehaha was raised from the bottom of Lake Minnetonka in 1980, restored, and returned to active service in 1996. The vessel operated uninterrupted on Lake Minnetonka until 2019. It is currently stored in a maintenance facility in the town of Excelsior.

History 

Minnehaha was built by the Twin City Rapid Transit Company (TCRT) in 1906 and provided fast and reliable transportation for the residents of Lake Minnetonka during much of the early twentieth century. She ran alongside five identical sister vessels named Como, Harriet, Hopkins, Stillwater, and White Bear. TCRT had commissioned boat builder Royal C. Moore to design these "Express Boats" in 1905. The boats were designed in Wayzata and assembled at TCRT's streetcar shops in south Minneapolis.

Express Boat service first began on May 25, 1906, from Minnetonka Beach. Later that year a streetcar transfer terminal was completed in Excelsior, and all routes (four in total) embarked and disembarked from there. The primary function assigned to the Express Boats was to provide fast and reliable transportation for the seasonal residents of Lake Minnetonka who commuted to work in the Minneapolis–Saint Paul area. The boats stopped at 26 designated landings around the lake. They were designed to closely resemble TCRT's streetcars from the internal details to the exterior yellow and red paint scheme.  Because of their appearance and the fact they were named after busy TCRT streetcar stops, they were nicknamed the "streetcar boats."

The streetcar boats proved to be very successful and economically solvent for many years. A seventh vessel named Excelsior was added to the fleet in 1915 because of high ridership. However, ridership plummeted when roads were improved around Lake Minnetonka in the early 1920s. TCRT made cuts to steamboat service after 1921 and discontinued all steamboat service on Lake Minnetonka in 1926. Three of the streetcar boats were scuttled that summer, including Minnehaha. Three others were scrapped. One of the vessels, the Hopkins, was sold to a private entity and used as an excursion boat until 1949 when it was also scuttled.

In 1979 a diver named Jerry Provost located the wreck of Minnehaha on the bottom of Lake Minnetonka. One year later, Provost and his underwater construction company raised Minnehaha to the surface with the intent of restoring and returning her to passenger service. However, due to a set of legal circumstances, Minnehaha sat in dry dock for 10 subsequent years. After much litigation, ownership of the vessel was ultimately transferred to the Steamboat Division of the Minnesota Transportation Museum in 1990, and a six-year restoration effort began. Minnehaha finally returned to passenger service on May 25, 1996, and operated on Lake Minnetonka as an excursion vessel until 2019.

Minnehaha is currently owned and operated by the Museum of Lake Minnetonka, a 501(c)(3) nonprofit, all-volunteer organization formed in 2004 and based in Excelsior, Minnesota. The museum lost access to Minnehaha'''s launch site at the end of 2019 and the vessel has been out of service since then. Minnehaha'' was added to the National Register of Historic Places in 2021.

Gallery

See also 
 Big Island Park
 Minnesota Streetcar Museum

References

External links 
Steamboat Minnehaha website

Maritime museums in Minnesota
Museums in Hennepin County, Minnesota
Passenger ships of the United States
National Register of Historic Places in Hennepin County, Minnesota
Ships on the National Register of Historic Places in Minnesota